Colyar is a surname. Notable people with the surname include:

Arthur St. Clair Colyar (1818–1907), American lawyer, Confederate politician, and newspaper editor
Michael Colyar (born 1957), American actor, comedian, voiceover artist, and author